Jamāl al-Dīn Abū Muḥammad ʿAbd al-Raḥīm ibn al-Ḥasan al-Umawī al-Qurashī al-Isnawī al-Shāfiʿī al-Miṣrī, commonly known as Jamal al-Din al-Isnawi, was a Sunni Egyptian scholar who specialized in the Shafi'i school of jurisprudence, legal theory, Qu'ran exegesis, and Arabic grammar. He was a well-known prolific writer who authored beneficial books.

Biography

Birth and Eudcation
Jamal al-Din al-Isnawi was born at the end of the month of Dhu al-Hijjah 704 AH which corresponds to July 1306 CE in Esna. He memorized the Qur’an when he was young and learned the principles of reading and writing, then he went to Cairo, the city of sciences, which was the destination for students of knowledge in that era and in the year pf 721 AH/1321 AD, he turned to the various sciences and was known for the quality of memorization, and he was interested in the beginning of the matter in the Arabic language, so that he was only known for grammar, and he learned the language sciences from Abu Hayyan al-Gharnati, who said to him: “I have not aged anyone at your age” and the age of Al-Asnawi at that time was twenty years old, but his understanding, intellect and genius exceeded this age until some of his elders counted him as a scholar like them. Al-Asnawi continued his interest in fiqh,  Usul al-Fiqh, Tafsir, and linguistic and he learned from a number of leading scholars of various sciences in his time, most notably: Sheikh al-Islam Taqi al-Din al-Subki until he excelled in jurisprudence, principles of jurisprudence, Qu'ran exegesis, and Arabic language. Organizing his time between work, classification and authorship.

Career
Al-Isnawi did not reach the age of twenty-seven until he was sitting to teach interpretation at the Ahmed Ibn Tulun Mosque, and at that time he was one of the beacons of scientific and jurisprudential radiation in Egypt. It took place between him and the minister Ibn Qazwinah, and ended with him the presidency of the Shafi'i's in his time, he taught in the large schools in Egypt, which were considered as universities, including the Royal School, Al-Iqbhawiya, and Al-Fadhiliya, and he used to spend most of his time writing, so students of knowledge accepted him and many of them benefited from him.

Students
Jamal al-Din al-Isnawi had a number of students, some who became renowned in their time; from them:
 Ibn al-Mulaqqin
 Zain al-Din al-'Iraqi
 Al-Zarkashi

Death
Jamal al-Din Al-Isnawi passed away on Sunday night, Jumada Al-Awwal 18, 772 AH/9th December 1370 AD, and was buried near the Sufi cemeteries in Cairo.

Reception
Ibn Hajar al-Asqalani says about him: “He was a skilled jurist, a mentor, a useful and righteous teacher, with righteousness, religion, courtship and humility." Jalal al-Din al-Suyuti said: “The Shafi’i leadership ended with him."

Zain al-Din al-'Iraqi said about him: "He worked in the sciences until he became the only one of his time, and the sheikh of the Shafi’is in his time, and he compiled the following useful books, and the students of the Egyptian lands graduated with him, and he was good in form and classification, soft in aspect, and a lot of benevolence."

Works
Jamal al-Din al-Isnawi was a prolific writer who authored books on various subjects such as jurisprudences, principles of jurisprudences, sciences of the Qu'ran and Arabic language: 
 'Nihayat Sul fi Sharh Minhaj al-Wusul, an explanation of the approach to accessing the science of usul by Al-Baydawi
 Sharh al-Minaj al-Fiqh, an explanation of Minhaj al-Talibin by Al-Nawawi
 The Preface to Investigate the Branches on the Fundamentals
  “Al-Kawakeb Al-Duriyah, investigating the jurisprudential branches on grammatical rules.
 'Tabaqat al-Shafi’i Guidance to the Illusions of Sufficiency Al-Ashabah wa’l-Nazeer “Jawahir al-Bahrain Tariza al-Mahafil Mala’a al-Daqaiq 
 Al-Kawkab al-Durri  The Golden Gems in Explanation of the Introductory Welcome The Important Words in Directing the People of the Dhimma 
 Nihaiyat al-Raghib Al-Fatawa Al-Hajwiyyah Taraz Al-Mahafil in the Mysteries of Al-Masaa’il Tadkirat al-Nabih fi Taseh al-Tanbih Explanation of the Incapacity of Ibn Yunus al-Mawsili''

References

1304 births
1370 deaths
Asharis
Shafi'is
Quranic exegesis scholars
14th-century jurists
Medieval grammarians of Arabic
14th-century Muslim scholars of Islam
Sunni Muslim scholars of Islam